is a retired Japanese athlete who specialised in sprinting events. She represented her country at the 2007 and 2009 World Championships.

Her personal bests are 11.44 seconds in the 100 metres (+1.7 m/s, Fukushima 2011) and 23.35 seconds in the 200 metres (+0.4 m/s, Fukuroi 2013).

She retired in October 2015. She is currently the coach of Toho Bank Athletics Club.

Personal bests

Competition record

National titles
Japanese Championships
4 × 100 m relay: 2003, 2005, 2007, 2008, 2009, 2010, 2012, 2013, 2014
4 × 400 m relay: 2007, 2009, 2012

Notes

References

External links

Mayumi Watanabe at JAAF 
Mayumi Watanabe at Toho Bank 
Mayumi Watanabe at TBS  (archived)

1983 births
Living people
Sportspeople from Niigata Prefecture
People from Niigata (city)
Fukushima University alumni
Japanese female sprinters
Asian Games medalists in athletics (track and field)
Athletes (track and field) at the 2010 Asian Games
World Athletics Championships athletes for Japan
Asian Games bronze medalists for Japan
Medalists at the 2010 Asian Games
Japanese athletics coaches